Butler Knob is a peak on the Jacks Mountain ridge in south central Pennsylvania in the United States. The "Knobs" summit is underlain with weather resistant quartzite of the Tuscarora Formation (Silurian Age). Butler Knob is accessible by a rough road, where there is a closed firetower on the summit. The firetower presently hold a weather station that gives current forecasts for the area (see link below).

There are views available from a nearby scree slope. The views are mainly east, south and west from here; the summits of Big Mountain, Sideling Hill, Williamsburg Mountain  and Blue Knob can be seen in the distance. Butler Knob is located within the Rothrock State Forest, all camping and activities on the mountain are subject to the rules and regulations of that agency.

References

Alan R. Geyer (1979) "Outstanding Geologic Features of Pennsylvania", Geological Survey of Pennsylvania

Charles H. Shultz (1999) "The Geology of Pennsylvania", Geological Survey of Pennsylvania

External links
Rothrock State Forest
Butler Knob Topo Map
Jacks Mountain firetower weather page

Mountains of Pennsylvania
Landforms of Huntingdon County, Pennsylvania